Cribin Fawr is a mountain in Snowdonia, North Wales, situated approximately four miles to the south-west of Aran Fawddwy. It is one of the peaks in the Dyfi hills, a subgroup of the Cadair Idris group. It is a top of Maesglase, connected to its parent peak by the Craig Portas ridge. The top of Cribin Fawr is a large open plateau of peat bog. To the west is Waun-oer, to the north Cadair Idris, to the south Maesglase and Glasgwm to the east.

References

External links
www.geograph.co.uk : photos of Maesglase and surrounding area

Brithdir and Llanfachreth
Corris
Mawddwy
Mountains and hills of Gwynedd
Mountains and hills of Snowdonia
Hewitts of Wales
Nuttalls
Dyfi Hills